HM Prison Ford (informally known as Ford Open Prison) is a Category D men's prison, located at Ford, in West Sussex, England, near Arundel and Littlehampton. The prison is operated by His Majesty's Prison Service.

Air Force and Navy use 
The site was initially RAF Ford before changing into Royal Naval Air Station Ford (RNAS Ford/HMS Peregrine) a Fleet Air Arm station.

The Westland Wyvern went into service first here in the early 1950s with 813 Naval Air Squadron.

The following units were here at some point:

Naval units

Units

Prison recent history 
The prison has been criticised for its lax security – especially after 70 people, including three murderers serving the last three years of their sentences, absconded in 2006 alone.

In March 2009, the prison's own Independent Monitoring Board issued a report stating that an outdated CCTV security system and a staffing shortage were contributing to burglars breaking into the jail to steal equipment from workshops. The report also found that drugs, alcohol and mobile phones were being smuggled into the prison for inmates. Two months later, an inspection report from His Majesty's Chief Inspector of Prisons found that inmates were leaving the prison complex at night to acquire alcohol. The report also stated that the prison was underperforming in preparing inmates for resettlement on release. In October 2009, an investigation was launched after it emerged that a prisoner at Ford had been able to remove documents from a disused office in the prison complex.

In July 2010, managers of Ford Prison had to apologise after Muslim prisoners at the jail were served burgers containing pork. 20 Muslim inmates were served the non-halal food before they noticed that the packaging for the burgers listed pork as an ingredient.

Notable former inmates 
Chris Atkins
Andy Cunningham
Khalid Masood
Gerald Ronson

References

External links
Ministry of Justice pages on Ford
 HMP Ford - HM Inspectorate of Prisons Reports

Category D prisons in England
Prisons in West Sussex
2011 riots
Arun District
1960 establishments in England
Prison uprisings in the United Kingdom
Men's prisons